Diego Peretti (born 10 February 1963)  is an Argentine actor, screenwriter and former psychiatrist.

Peretti was born in Buenos Aires, and practiced as a psychiatrist for fourteen years. He took part in several movies and TV series, including the 2004 romantic comedy No sos vos, soy yo, and his most famous rol as Emilio Ravenna in the satire Los Simuladores a popular TV series aired on Telefé. He starred opposite Carolina Peleritti in ¿Quién dice que es fácil?, and, drawing on his background in psychiatry for a number of roles, has starred in a number of crime dramas, including Bottom of the Sea (The Bottom of the Ocean, 2004), Wakolda (2013), The Heist of the Century (2020), Tiempo de Valientes (A Time for Valor, 2005), and La Señal (The Signal, 2007).

In 2012, he starred in a show named En terapia, which was the local adaptation of In Treatment aired on TV Pública, the public channel managed by the National Government.

Filmography
Cinema
El sueño de los héroes (1997)
Punto muerto (short subject - 1998)
Cohen vs. Rosi (1998)
Mala época (1998)
Los últimos días (1999)
Alma Mía (1999)
Los Pintín al rescate (2000)
Taxi, un encuentro (2001)
El Fondo del Mar (2003)
No sos vos, soy yo (2004)
Tiempo de Valientes (2005)
¿Quién dice que es fácil? (2007)
La Señal (2007)
Música en espera (2009)
Al final del camino (2009)
Un amor (2011)
Maktub (2011)
En fuera de juego (2012)
La reconstrucción (2013)
Wakolda (2013)
Papeles en el viento (2015)
Showroom (2015)
No Kids (2015)
Mecánica popular (2016)
The Night My Mother Killed My Father (2016)
Cási leyendas (2017)
Ten Days Without Mom (2017)
Re loca (2018)
Initials SG (2019)
The Heist of the Century (2020)
La noche mágica (2021)
The Wrath of God (2022)

TV series
Poliladron (1994)
R.R.D.T (1997)
Gasoleros (1998)
Champions of Life (1999)
Culpables (2001)
Máximo corazón (2002)
Los Simuladores (2003)
Locas de amor (2003)
Botines (2005)
Criminal (2005)
El hombre que volvió de la muerte (2007)
En terapia (2012-2014)
 El reino (2021)

Awards

Nominations
 2013 Martín Fierro Awards
 Best actor of miniseries

Personal life 
He has a daughter, actress Mona Peretti, who was conceived with his wife Natalia.

References

External links
 
 

1963 births
Living people
Male actors from Buenos Aires
Argentine people of Italian descent
Argentine male film actors
Argentine male stage actors
Argentine male television actors
Argentine psychiatrists